English-language slang